Giannis Kargas (born 9 December 1994) is a Greek professional footballer who plays as a centre-back for Super League club PAOK.

Career

Early career
The 1.88 meter tall defender, started his career in the academies of Kavala and in 2011 he signed a professional contract with the people of Kavala. He played 20 times with the club's jersey and then followed his transfer to Fostiras in 2013 where he stayed for only 6 months. In January 2014 he moved to Patra on behalf of Panachaiki, where he remained for 2 years (48 appearances, 1 goal and 2 assists), to move to Platanias in January 2016 Kargas showed that he was perfectly suited to the top level of Greek football and in 18 months he wore the shirt of the Cretan team 26 times, even scoring two goals. In the summer of 2017 he was acquired as a free agent by Panionios. He stayed in Nea Smyrni for only 6 months, as in February 2018 a proposal came from the Belarusian Dinamo Brest. He remained in Belarus for a year, competing 26 times won the Cup and the Super Cup of the country and in the winter of 2019 he returned to his homeland and PAS Giannina, he played in 11 games and in the summer he left to move out of Greece again six months later, on behalf of Levski Sofia with which he counted 29 appearances in the 2019-20 season. One year later, he was released by Levski Sofia and subsequently returned to PAS Giannina.

PAS Giannina
Kargas comes from a "full" and excellent season with the jersey of the team of Epirus, as he played in a total of 36 games, scoring 3 goals. He was, after all, one of the top in his position in the Greek championship last season. He also won a place in the top 11, as formed by CIES, the international center for sports research! He had a very good season in 2020-2021, being even then a key and irreplaceable player in PAS, counting 29 participations in all domestic competitions and scoring 3 goals again. With the shirt of PAS, he has a total of 73 matches and six goals. After the very good last season that he had, PAOK decided to trust him for their defense.

PAOK
Giannis Kargas is expected to continue his career with "Dikefalos tou Vorras" coming to an agreement with PAS Giannina. A player of PAOK should be considered, Giannis Kargas. The "black and whites" came to an agreement with both the player and PAS Giannina, in a transfer which will cost 300,000 euros.

Career statistics

Honours
Dynamo Brest
 Belarusian Cup: 2017–18
 Belarusian Super Cup: 2018

Individual
Super League Greece Team of the Year: 2021–22

References

External links 
 
 Profile at LevskiSofia.info

1994 births
Living people
Greek footballers
Association football defenders
Greek expatriate footballers
Greek expatriate sportspeople in Belarus
Expatriate footballers in Belarus
Greek expatriate sportspeople in Bulgaria
Expatriate footballers in Bulgaria
Kavala F.C. players
Fostiras F.C. players
Panachaiki F.C. players
Platanias F.C. players
Panionios F.C. players
FC Dynamo Brest players
PFC Levski Sofia players
PAS Giannina F.C. players
PAOK FC players
Football League (Greece) players
Super League Greece players
Belarusian Premier League players
First Professional Football League (Bulgaria) players
Footballers from Kilkis